Web of Shadows can refer to any of the following:

Bionicle 3: Web of Shadows, the third movie of the Bionicle series
Spider-Man: Web of Shadows, a 2008 videogame based in the Marvel Comics character Spider-Man